Gul Bashra is a Pakistani politician who has been a member of Senate of Pakistan since March 2015.

Political career

She was elected to the Senate of Pakistan as a candidate of Pakhtunkhwa Milli Awami Party on reserved seat for women in 2015 Pakistani Senate election.

References

Living people
Pakistani senators (14th Parliament)
Women members of the Senate of Pakistan
Year of birth missing (living people)
21st-century Pakistani women politicians